The Soldiers is the fourth album by The Soldiers. The album was released on 28 October 2012. It peaked at number 23 on the UK Albums Chart.

Track listing
Standard listing
"Healing Hands" - 3:57
"The Living Years" (feat. Mike Rutherford) - 5:37
"She" (with Charles Aznavour) - 3:43
"Mothers Pride" - 3:52
"I Have a Dream" - 4:58
"Picture of You" - 3:12
"It's Saturday Night" - 2:36
"Amazed" - 4:01
"With the Ones I Love" - 2:57
"Home" - 3:36
"Daniel" - 3:45
"How Deep Is Your Love" - 4:00
"Love Farewell (with the Duke of York Military School Choir) - 3:57
"Power of Love" - 5:15
"Back for Good" - 4:02
"Songbird (with Caroline Redman Lusher) - 3:22

Personnel
 Mike Rutherford - vocals
 Charles Aznavour - vocals
 Trooper Ryan Idzi - vocals
 Sergeant Major Gary Chilton - vocals
 Sergeant Richie Maddocks - vocals

Chart performance

Release history

References

2012 albums
The Soldiers albums